The 1969 2. divisjon was a Norwegian second-tier football league season.

The league was contested by 16 teams, divided into two groups; A and B. The winners of group A and B were promoted to the 1970 1. divisjon. The two bottom teams in both groups were relegated to the 3. divisjon.

Overview

Summary
Pors won group A with 22 points. Hamarkameratene won group B with 22 points. Both teams promoted to the 1970 1. divisjon.

Tables

Group A

Group B

References

Norwegian First Division seasons
1969 in Norwegian football
Norway
Norway